Who Killed Garrett Phillips? is a 2019 documentary in two parts by American film director and producer Liz Garbus.

Synopsis 
On Oct. 24, 2011, 12-year-old Garrett Phillips was murdered in his home in Potsdam, a small town in upstate New York. Police quickly suspected Oral "Nick" Hillary, a Jamaican man in the mostly white community, who was a soccer coach at Clarkson University and the ex-boyfriend of Garrett's mother, Tandy Cyrus. The documentary chronicles the years following the murder including the interrogation, arrest, and trial for second degree murder trial of Nick Hillary, the prime suspect. He opted to be tried by a judge and was acquitted. In the course of the trial it is revealed that public state prosecutor, Mary E. Rain withheld exculpatory evidence from the defense. This, and additional instances of professional misconduct, led to Rain being banned for two years from practicing law.

Reception 

The film premiered on June 20, 2019 at AFI Docs Film Festival in Washington DC as part of the festival's "Truth and Justice" program. It was subsequently broadcast on July 23 and 24 2019 on HBO in the US. The documentary received positive reviews.

References

External links

2019 documentary films
2019 films
American documentary films
Documentary films about crime in the United States
2010s American films